The 2018–19 season was Parma Calcio 1913's first season in Serie A since bankruptcy in 2015. The club competed in Serie A and in the Coppa Italia. 

On 23 July 2018, Parma were handed a 5 point deduction for the 2018–19 Serie A season, following text messages from Parma player Emanuele Calaiò "eliciting a reduced effort" from two players of Spezia, a match Parma won 2–0 to secure promotion last season. However, that ban was overturned on 9 August following a decision by the Italian Football Federation's Board of Appeal.

Players

Squad information

Appearances include league matches only

a. Banned until 31 December 2018 for attempted match-fixing.

Transfers

In

Loans in

Out

Loans out

Competitions

Serie A

League table

Results summary

Results by round

Matches

Coppa Italia

Statistics

Appearances and goals

|-
! colspan=14 style=background:#DCDCDC; text-align:center"| Goalkeepers

|-
! colspan=14 style=background:#DCDCDC; text-align:center"| Defenders

|-
! colspan=14 style=background:#DCDCDC; text-align:center"| Midfielders

|-
! colspan=14 style=background:#DCDCDC; text-align:center"| Forwards

|-
! colspan=14 style=background:#DCDCDC; text-align:center"| Players transferred out during the season

Goalscorers

Last updated: 26 May 2019

Clean sheets

Last updated: 26 May 2019

Disciplinary record

Last updated: 26 May 2019

References

Parma Calcio 1913 seasons
Parma